Muhammad Edrus Muhammad Yunos (born 19 July 1987) is a Malaysian male  track cyclist. He competed in the two events at the 2011 UCI Track Cycling World Championships and in the three events at the 2012 UCI Track Cycling World Championships.

References

External links
 
 
 

1987 births
Living people
Malaysian track cyclists
Malaysian male cyclists
Place of birth missing (living people)
Cyclists at the 2010 Asian Games
Cyclists at the 2014 Asian Games
Cyclists at the 2014 Commonwealth Games
Cyclists at the 2010 Commonwealth Games
Southeast Asian Games medalists in cycling
Southeast Asian Games gold medalists for Malaysia
Competitors at the 2007 Southeast Asian Games
Asian Games competitors for Malaysia
Commonwealth Games competitors for Malaysia
20th-century Malaysian people
21st-century Malaysian people